Juan Ossio Acuña  has been the Peruvian Minister of Culture under President Alan García since September 2010. He studied at the National University of San Marcos, and at Linacre College, Oxford. Prior to that, he was a professor at the Pontifical Catholic University of Peru.

References

1943 births
Living people
People from Lima
National University of San Marcos alumni
Harvard University faculty
Government ministers of Peru
Alumni of Linacre College, Oxford
Academic staff of the Pontifical Catholic University of Peru